Robert Cordell may refer to:

Robert Cordell (Syphon Filter)
Sir Robert Cordell, 1st Baronet (c. 1616–1680), MP for Sudbury

See also
Cordell (surname)